Jasser Khmiri (born 27 July 1997) is a Tunisian professional footballer who plays as a defender for San Antonio FC in the USL Championship.

Club career
In February 2019, Khimiri joined Major League Soccer side Vancouver Whitecaps FC. In doing so he became the first Tunisian player to play in Major League Soccer.

In March 2021, he went on loan to San Antonio FC of the USL Championship for the 2021 season.

Following the 2021 season, Vancouver declined their contract option on Khmiri.

International career
He made his national team debut on 9 October 2020 in a friendly against Sudan.

References

External links 
 
 MLS profile

1997 births
Living people
Tunisian footballers
Tunisia international footballers
Association football defenders
Stade Tunisien players
Vancouver Whitecaps FC players
Major League Soccer players
San Antonio FC players
USL Championship players